This page lists public opinion polls that have been conducted in relation to the issue of Catalan independence.

Polling institutions

Centre for Opinion Studies
The Centre for Opinion Studies (Centre d'Estudis d'Opinió; CEO) fell under the purview of the Economy Ministry of the Generalitat of Catalonia until early 2011. Since then it has been placed under direct control of the Presidency of the Generalitat and is currently headed by Jordi Argelaguet i Argemí. Since the second quarter of 2011, CEO has conducted polls regarding public sentiments toward independence.

 The question was not asked in this survey; instead the two part question was asked (see below).

CEO likewise conducted polls in the 1st and 2nd series of 2014 based on the 9N independence referendum format. The questions and choices involved were:
 Do you want Catalonia to become a State? (Yes/No)
 If the answer for question 1 is in the affirmative: Do you want this State to be independent? (Yes/No)

In addition, CEO performs regular polls studying opinion of Catalan citizens regarding Catalonia's political status within Spain. The following table contains the answers to the question "Which kind of political entity should Catalonia be with respect to Spain?":

Social and Political Sciences Institute of Barcelona

The Political Sciences Institute of Barcelona (Institut de Ciències Polítiques i Socials; ICPS) performed an opinion poll annually from 1989, which sometimes included a section on independence. The results are in the following table:

 telephonic instead of door-to-door interview

Newspaper polls
Catalan newspapers El Periódico and La Vanguardia also published surveys up to 2013.

El Periódico

 The same poll, but asking what would be the case if a yes vote would imply leaving the EU

La Vanguardia

References

External links
 ICPS studies
 CEO studies

Catalan independence movement
Opinion polling in Spain
Catalan